Regent-Rennoc Court is a historic apartment complex located in the Southwest Schuylkill neighborhood of Philadelphia, Pennsylvania. The complex consists of nine buildings built in 1910, in the Renaissance Revival-style. They are large, six-unit buildings arranged in groups of three on either side of Regent Street.  They are three-story buildings, constructed of brick and sit on Wissahickon schist foundations.  They feature projecting arched center entrances and multiple porch levels.

It was added to the National Register of Historic Places in 1985.

References

Residential buildings on the National Register of Historic Places in Philadelphia
Renaissance Revival architecture in Pennsylvania
Residential buildings completed in 1910
Southwest Philadelphia